The Central National Committee of the Buryat-Mongols of Eastern Siberia , generally known by its Russian language abbreviation Burnatskom (Бурнацком), was an organization of Buryat people in Russia during the Russian Revolution. 

The group gathered virtually all Buryat prominent leaders at the time. Burnatskom supported Alexander Kerensky's Provisional Government and promoted national autonomy. On 25 April 1917 the First All-Buryat Congress formalized the foundation of Burnatskom. In April 1917 Burnatskom set up the autonomous State of Buryat-Mongolia. Burnatskom had its headquarters in Chita and a branch in Irkutsk.

The leaders of Burnatskom sympathised with the Socialist-Revolutionary Party and envisioned a socialist state compatible with Buddhism. Burnatskom sought to reform and modernise Buddhist religious practices.  The organization promoted a regional parliament, education in the Buryat language, and pan-Mongolism.  However the organization also expressed its willingness to cooperate with the Soviet government if Buryat national institutions would remain intact.

In the political strife of 1917, the Burnatskom competed with the Transbaikal Cossack Party for influence over the region. As Buryat leaders were not given prominent positions on the Socialist-Revolutionary list, Burnatskom fielded its own list in the Transbaikal constituency in the 1917 Russian Constituent Assembly election, obtaining 17,083 votes (17.39%). Burnatskom joined the Nationalities Council of the Provisional Siberian Government in Tomsk in December 1917. Burnatskom organized military units, to "defend religion and national welfare", which the White ataman Grigory Mikhaylovich Semyonov used as rear-guard troops. Nevertheless, relations between Burnatskom and Semyonov remained tense.

Burnatskom continued to exist until 1919. After the establishment of Soviet power in Buryatia, Burnatskom came to be branded as "bourgeois nationalists" and "anti-Soviet". In 2017 the National Museum of the Republic of Bashkortostan organized an exhibition to celebrate the centenary of Burnatskom, highlighting its role as the first expression of Buryat self-governance.

References

Political parties of the Russian Revolution
Political parties established in 1917
Socialist Revolutionary Party